Cichlidogyrus kmentovae is a species of monopisthocotylean monogenean in the family Dactylogyridae (or Ancyrocephalidae according to certain classifications). It is a parasite of the gills of the fish Hemichromis stellifer (Perciforme, Cichlidae) of the lower Basin of River Congo.

Etymology
According to Jorissen et al. (2018), the specific epithet kmentovae refers to "biologist Nikol Kmentová (Czech Republic), an enthusiastic researcher on the monogenean fauna of Lake Tanganyika".

References

Dactylogyridae
Animals described in 2018